Salisbury Park is a northern suburb of Adelaide, located in the City of Salisbury, South Australia. It is on the south bank of the Little Para River, bounded by Main North Road and Saints Road.

References